Lepthyphantes turbatrix is a species of sheetweb spider in the family Linyphiidae. It is found in North America and Greenland.

References

Linyphiidae
Articles created by Qbugbot
Spiders described in 1877